This list of tallest buildings in Yellowknife ranks skyscrapers over  tall in the city of Yellowknife, Northwest Territories, Canada. Yellowknife is the capital of and largest city in the Northwest Territories and the second largest in Northern Canada. As of 2011, the city contains 3 skyscrapers  and over, with a further 7 high-rise buildings that exceed  in height. The tallest building in the city, and the NWT, is the 17-storey,  Centre Square – Northern Heights. This building was constructed in a postmodernist architectural style, representing the city's efforts to add visual interest into the skyline.

Having a population of almost 20,000 people, Yellowknife has a skyline that is disproportionately large, considering its size, population, and location. This is due to Yellowknife's position in a vast resource-rich area in Northern Canada, a region larger than India. More specifically it is the capital of the Northwest Territories which compose a large part of Northern Canada. Yellowknife is the largest city in the Northwest Territories, and, as such, many large businesses such as diamond-mining and iron-mining consortiums are headquartered or have bases in the city. The city acts as a distribution point for many of these resources. Yellowknife is connected to the southern Canadian city of Edmonton via the Yellowknife and Mackenzie Highways.

List of tallest buildings
This includes spires and architectural details but does not include antenna masts.

Other notable buildings

Con Mine

At  the Robertson headframe located at Con Mine was the tallest building in Yellowknife and the Northwest Territories. The headframe was demolished on 29 October 2016.

Explorer Hotel
The Explorer Hotel is located on 49th Avenue in Yellowknife, Northwest Territories, Canada. It is an eight-storey-tall modernist concrete structure built in 1974. Located atop an outcrop overlooking downtown, the hotel is one of the most prominent buildings in the city, and claims to be the largest hotel in Northern Canada; it has also been described as the city's best and grandest. It is owned and operated by Nunastar Properties. The building was expanded in 2008 and 2019.

Greenstone Building

The Greenstone Building on Franklin Avenue downtown houses offices of 16 different federal government agencies. Before its completion in 2005, on time and under budget, those offices had been scattered in different locations. In 2007 it was certified LEED Gold by the Canadian Green Building Council for its environmental sustainability; among other features it generates some of its own electricity through building-integrated photovoltaics. It was the first building in the Canadian North to receive LEED certification of any level.

Mackenzie Place
Mackenzie Place, known locally as the High Rise, is a 17-storey building located in Hay River on the south side of Great Slave Lake. Although no accurate height is known it is sometimes called the tallest building in the NWT.

Northwest Territories Legislative Building

The Northwest Territories Legislative Building is the home of the Government of the Northwest Territories. The most recent building was built in 1993 and commenced usage in 1994. The Legislative Assembly has used many permanent and temporary facilities throughout its history.

The current building is two stories tall with two round halls, the Great Hall and the Caucus Room. It is located in Yellowknife, and overlooks Frame Lake. It was designed by Ferguson Simek Clark/Pin Matthews (of Yellowknife) in association with Matsuzaki Wright Architects (of Vancouver), and landscape architect Cornelia Oberlander.

Timeline of tallest buildings

Nunavut and Yukon

See also

 Architecture of Canada
 List of tallest buildings in Canada

Maps

 Centre Square – Northern Heights – 
 Watermark Tower (Polar Apartments) – 
 Northwest Tower – 
 Scotia Centre – 
 Coast Fraser Tower – 
 Precambrian Building – 

 Anderson – Thomson Tower – 
 Bellanca Building – 
 Northern United Place – 
 Explorer Hotel – 
 Northwest Territories Legislative Building –

References

 
Yellowknife
Tallest buildings in Yellowknife